The 1966 Tulsa Golden Hurricane football team represented the University of Tulsa during the 1966 NCAA University Division football season. In their sixth year under head coach Glenn Dobbs, the Golden Hurricane compiled a 6–4 record, 3–1 against conference opponents, and finished tied for first place in the Missouri Valley Conference.

The team's statistical leaders included Greg Barton with 1,673 passing yards, Gene Lakusiak with 330 rushing yards, and Neal Sweeney with 740 receiving yards.

Schedule

References

Tulsa
Tulsa Golden Hurricane football seasons
Missouri Valley Conference football champion seasons
Tulsa Golden Hurricane football